American Wrestling Alliance may refer to:

 American Wrestling Association, a defunct professional wrestling promotion headquartered in Minneapolis, Minnesota, United States
 American Wrestling Association, name used by professional wrestling promoter Paul Bowser for an alleged governing body responsible for sanctioning the AWA World Heavyweight Championship (Boston version)
 Big Time Wrestling (San Francisco), a defunct professional wrestling promotion headquartered in San Francisco, California, United States